| past_members    =

Balkanika is a Serbian group formed by Sanja Ilić in 1998. They represented Serbia in the Eurovision Song Contest 2018 in Lisbon, Portugal, with the song "Nova deca".

The mission of the group is, as affirmed by Ilić, to preserve, revitalize and modernize Serbian medieval and byzantine music traditions.

Members 
Other members of the group include:
vocalists: Nevena Stamenković (born 11 April), Danica Krstić (born 25 November 1995), Marija Bjelanović, Mladen Lukić, and Nemanja Kojić
percussionists: Aleksandar Radulović and Milan Jejina 
guitarists: Branimir Marković and Nebojša Nedeljković 
flautist: Ljubomir Dimitrijević

Awards

See also 
Eurovision Song Contest 2018
Serbia in the Eurovision Song Contest
Serbia in the Eurovision Song Contest 2018

References 

1998 establishments in Serbia
Eurovision Song Contest entrants of 2018
Musical groups established in 1998
Musical groups from Belgrade
Eurovision Song Contest entrants for Serbia
Serbian pop music groups
Beovizija contestants
Beovizija winners